The Major League Lacrosse draft was the annual draft of outstanding amateur lacrosse players from American colleges and universities into the professional ranks of Major League Lacrosse (MLL). The North American league, made up of 9 teams, began conducting the draft in 2001, and continued to do so through its final season in 2020, after which it merged into the Premier Lacrosse League.

First round picks

The full draft article is linked in the season column.

References

draft
Drafts (sports)